The Andromeda Strain is a 1971 American science fiction thriller film produced and directed by Robert Wise. Based on Michael Crichton's 1969 novel of the same name and adapted by Nelson Gidding, the film stars Arthur Hill, James Olson, Kate Reid, and David Wayne as a team of scientists who investigate a deadly organism of extraterrestrial origin. With a few exceptions, the film follows the book closely. The special effects were designed by Douglas Trumbull. The film is notable for its use of split screen in certain scenes.

Plot 
Dr. Jeremy Stone recounts the events before the United States Senate Committee on Space Sciences in 1971:

After a U.S. government satellite crashes near the small rural town of Piedmont, New Mexico on February 5, nearly all the residents are dead. A military recovery team from Vandenberg Air Force Base tries to recover the satellite but is unsuccessful. Suspecting that the satellite has brought back an alien organism, the military activates an elite team of scientists.

Dr. Stone, the team leader, and Dr. Mark Hall, a surgeon, are dropped in by helicopter. They discover the town's doctor opened the satellite in his office and that all of his blood has crystallized into a powder, the same death befalling nearly all of the town. Stone and Hall retrieve the satellite and find two survivors, 69-year-old alcoholic Peter Jackson and six-month-old crying infant Manuel Rios.

The elite team also includes Dr. Charles Dutton and Dr. Ruth Leavitt, who join them at a top-secret Nevada underground facility, code named Wildfire. They go through four sub-levels of decontamination procedures, arriving at the fifth sub-level laboratories. If the organism threatens to escape, the Wildfire facility includes an automatic nuclear self-destruct mechanism to incinerate all infectious agents. Under the "odd man hypothesis", Dr. Hall is entrusted with the only key that can deactivate the device, the theory being that an unmarried male is the most dispassionate person within a group to make critical decisions in a crisis.

Examining the satellite, the team discovers the microscopic alien organism that caused the deaths. The greenish, throbbing life form is assigned the code name "Andromeda." Inhaled through the lungs, Andromeda kills biological life almost instantly via a blood clot in the brain and asphyxiation. It appears to be highly virulent. The team studies the organism using animal subjects, an electron microscope, and culturing in various growth media to learn how it behaves. The microbe contains the hydrogen and carbon required for terrestrial life and appears to have a crystalline structure, but lacks the DNA, RNA, proteins, and amino acids present in all forms of terrestrial life, and directly transforms energy to matter with no discernible byproducts.

Hall tries to determine why the two Piedmont residents survived. Unknown to the others, Leavitt's research on the germ is impaired by her undisclosed epilepsy.

A military jet crashes near Piedmont after the pilot radios that his plastic oxygen mask is dissolving.

Hall realizes that the alcoholic Jackson survived because his blood was acidic from drinking Sterno, and that the baby lived due to his blood being too alkaline from constant crying, suggesting that Andromeda can only survive only within a narrow range of blood pH. Just as he has this insight, the organism mutates into a non-lethal form that degrades synthetic rubber and plastic. Andromeda escapes the biocontainment room into the lab where Dutton is working. When Andromeda causes all the laboratory's seals to start decaying, a five-minute countdown to nuclear destruction is initiated. Hall rescues Leavitt from an epileptic seizure, triggered by the flashing red lights of Wildfire's alarm system.

The team realizes that the microbe would thrive on the energy of a nuclear explosion and would consequently be transformed into a super-colony that could destroy all life on Earth. Hall races to reach a functioning station where he can disable the nuclear bomb with his key. He endures multiple attacks by automated lasers as he climbs through the laboratory's central core. He finds a working station, disables the bomb with seconds to spare, and collapses.

Hall awakens in a hospital. His colleagues reveal that clouds are being seeded over the Pacific Ocean, which will cause rain to sweep Andromeda from the atmosphere and into alkaline seawater, rendering it harmless.

Stone finishes testifying by saying that while they were able to defeat the alien pathogen, they may be unable to do so in the future. The film ends with a computer feed suddenly stopping and the computer flashing the number "601", the Wildfire code for information coming in too fast to analyze.

Cast 

In addition, source author Michael Crichton makes a cameo appearance in the scene where Dr. Hall is pulled from surgery to report to Wildfire.

Background 
Film rights were bought by Universal Pictures for $250,000 in 1969. The cast of characters in the novel was modified for the film, including by replacing the male Dr. Peter Leavitt in the novel with the female Dr. Ruth Leavitt. Screenwriter Nelson Gidding suggested the change to Wise, who at first was not enthusiastic, as he initially pictured the female Dr. Leavitt as a largely decorative character reminiscent of Raquel Welch's character in the 1966 film Fantastic Voyage. When Gidding explained his take on Leavitt, Wise resolved the question by asking the opinion of a number of scientists, who were unanimously enthusiastic about the idea. Eventually Wise came to be very happy with the decision to make Leavitt female, feeling that Kate Reid's Dr. Leavitt was "the most interesting character" in the film. Another minor change was the character of Burton in the novel, who became Charles Dutton in the film; no reason was given for this name change.

The Andromeda Strain was one of the first films to use advanced computerized photographic visual effects, with work by Douglas Trumbull, who had pioneered effects for 2001: A Space Odyssey, along with James Shourt and Albert Whitlock who worked on The Birds. Reportedly $250,000 of the film's budget of $6.5 million was used to create the special effects, including Trumbull's simulation of an electron microscope.

The film contained a faux computer rendering, created with conventional film-making processes, of a mapped 3-D view of the rotating structure of the five-story cylindrical underground laboratory in the Nevada desert named Project Wildfire. The filming in the fictional town of Piedmont took place in Shafter, Texas, while other filming was conducted at Ocotillo Wells, California.

Reception

Box office 
The Andromeda Strain was a box office success. Produced on a relatively high budget of $6.5 million, the film grossed $12,376,563 in North America, earning $8.2 million in United States theatrical rentals. It was the 16th highest-grossing film of 1971.

Critical response 
The opinion of critics is generally mixed, with some critics enjoying the film for its dedication to the original novel and with others disliking it for its drawn-out plot. At review aggregator website Rotten Tomatoes, the film has a 67% approval rating based on 39 reviews, with an average score of 6.3/10. The website's critics consensus reads: "Although its urgent subject matter warrants less a deliberate pace, The Andromeda Strain brings Michael Crichton's techno-thriller to the big screen with striking intelligence and an engrossing sense of paranoia." Roger Greenspun of The New York Times panned the film in the 22 March 1971 issue, calling the novel "dreadful." 
John Simon called The Andromeda Strain "a tidy film, yet it completely fades from memory after its 130 minutes are over."

Scientific response 
A 2003 publication by the Infectious Diseases Society of America noted that The Andromeda Strain is the "most significant, scientifically accurate, and prototypic of all films of this [killer virus] genre ... it accurately details the appearance of a deadly agent, its impact, and the efforts at containing it, and, finally, the work-up on its identification and clarification on why certain persons are immune to it."

Awards and honors 
The film was nominated for two Academy Awards:
Best Art Direction (Boris Leven, William H. Tuntke, Ruby R. Levitt); lost to Nicholas and Alexandra
Best Film Editing (Stuart Gilmore, John W. Holmes); lost to The French Connection

The film was nominated for science fiction's 1972 Hugo Award for Best Dramatic Presentation (for works appearing in calendar year 1971).

See also 
List of American films of 1971
The Andromeda Strain, a 2008 television miniseries adaptation of the same novel

References

Further reading
 Tibbetts, John C., and James M. Welsh, eds. The Encyclopedia of Novels into Film (2nd ed. 2005) pp 17–18.

External links 

The Andromeda Strain, film review at Taint The Meat.com
The Andromeda Strain, analisis at Cinephilia & Beyond

1971 films
1970s disaster films
1970s science fiction thriller films
American disaster films
American science fiction thriller films
Biological weapons in popular culture
1970s English-language films
Films about extraterrestrial life
Films about space hazards
Films about viral outbreaks
Films based on American novels
Films based on science fiction novels
Films based on thriller novels
Films based on works by Michael Crichton
Films directed by Robert Wise
Films scored by Gil Mellé
Procedural films
Techno-thriller films
Universal Pictures films
Films set in New Mexico
Films set in Utah
Films shot in Texas
Films shot in California
Films set in Washington, D.C.
1970s American films
Films produced by Robert Wise